Steve Howe is an English guitarist, active since 1964. He is best known for his tenures with the rock groups Yes and Asia, including his solo albums.

Discography

Solo
 Studio albums 
 Beginnings (1975)
 The Steve Howe Album (1979)
 Turbulence (1991)
 The Grand Scheme of Things (1993)
 Quantum Guitar (1998)
 Portraits of Bob Dylan (1999)
 Natural Timbre (2001)
 Masterpiece Guitars  with Martin Taylor (2002; recorded 1996)
 Skyline (2002)
 Elements (2003)
 Spectrum (2005)
 Motif (2008)
 Time (2011)
 Love Is (2020)

 Live albums  
 Not Necessarily Acoustic (1994)
 Pulling Strings (1999)
 Remedy Live (2005)

Homebrew series 
The Homebrew series consists on compilations of demos and other mostly solo recordings. Some of these recordings were eventually reworked into songs appearing in other solo or group albums, while others are new versions of previous songs. 
 Homebrew (1996)
 Homebrew 2 (2000)
 Homebrew 3 (2005)
 Homebrew 4 (2010)
 Homebrew 5 (2013)
 Homebrew 6 (2016)
 Homebrew 7 (2021)

The Steve Howe Trio 
 The Haunted Melody (2008) 
 Travelling (2010)
 New Frontier (2019)

Compilations 
 Mothballs (1994 - compilation with pieces from The Syndicats, The In Crowd, Tomorrow, Keith West, Canto, Bodast and solo tracks)
Light Walls (2003 - 2CD's compilation from Seraphim, Voyagers, Quantum Guitar, Portraits of Bob Dylan and Natural Timbre)
Guitar World (2003 - compilation from: Portraits of Bob Dylan and Natural Timbre)
Anthology - A solo career retrospective (2015 - 2CD totalling 33 songs)
Anthology 2: Groups and Collaborations (2016 - 3CD totalling 56 songs)

Videography
 Classic Rock Legends (2002)
 Careful With That Axe (2004)
 Steve Howe's Remedy Live (2005)

With other bands

With The Syndicats 
 Maybellene / True To Me (1964) Produced by Joe Meek (EMI)
 Howlin For My Baby/(Tell Me) What To Do  (1965), Produced by Joe Meek  (EMI)
 The Horizon, (reached number 17 on the charts) / Crawdaddy Simone (1965) (Steve played on The horizon), Produced by Joe Meek (EMI)
 The hit song Maybellene, on a 1964 compilation LP On the scene (With The Animals, Georgie Fame, Yardbirds, Mickie Most, Downliners sect. - Columbia/EMI)

With The In Crowd (became Tomorrow) 
"Why Must They Criticise" / "You're On Your Own" Produced by Roy Pitt. (single, Parlophone R5364, November 1965)
"Stop, Wait A Minute" / "I Don't Mind" (single, Parlophone R5328, September 1965)

With Tomorrow 
 My White Bicycle/Claramount Lake (single)
 Revolution/Three Jolly Little Dwarfs (single)
 Tomorrow (Parlophone, February 1968) (rééd. Tomorrow featuring Keith West, 1999)
 50 Minute Technicolor Dream (RPM 184, 1998)

With Bodast 
 The Early Years - Steve Howe with Bodast (CD 1988 & 1990 - first LP edit in 1969 (CS))

With Yes 
 Studio albums  
 The Yes Album (1971)
 Fragile (1971)
 Close to the Edge (1972)
 Tales from Topographic Oceans (1973)
 Relayer (1974)
 Going for the One (1977)
 Tormato (1978)
 Drama (1980)
 Union (1991)
 Keys to Ascension (1996) (live and studio tracks)
 Keys to Ascension 2 (1997) (live and studio tracks)
 Open Your Eyes (1997)
 The Ladder (1999)
 Magnification (2001)
 Fly from Here (2011)
 Heaven & Earth (2014)
 From a Page (2019)
 The Quest (2 CD) (2021)

 Live albums 
 Yessongs (1973) 
 Yesshows (1980) 
 Keys to Ascension (1996) (live and studio tracks)
 Keys to Ascension 2 (1997) (live and studio tracks)
 House of Yes: Live from House of Blues  (2000) 
 Symphonic Live (1 CD) (2003) (Would be Re-edited in 2009 in a two CD package)
 The Word Is Live (3 CD) (2005)
 Live at Montreux 2003 (2007)
 Symphonic Live (2 CD) (2009) 
 In the Present – Live from Lyon (2011)
 Songs from Tsongas (2014)
 Like It Is: Yes at the Bristol Hippodrome (2 CD + DVD) (2014)
Progeny: Seven Shows from Seventy-Two (14 CD) (2015)
 Progeny: Highlights from Seventy-Two (2 CD) (2015)
 Like It Is: Yes at the Mesa Arts Center  (2 CD + DVD) (2015)
Topographic Drama – Live Across America (2 CD) (2017)
Yes 50 Live (2 CD) (2019)
The Royal Affair Tour: Live from Las Vegas (2020)
Union 30 Live (2021) - 26 CD Boxset 

 Compilations
 The New Age of Atlantic (1972)
 Yesterdays (1975) - Steve plays on America 
 Classic Yes (1981) 
 Yesyears (1991) - 4 CD Boxset
 Yesstory (1992) 
 Affirmative: The Yes Solo Family Album (1993) 
 Highlights: The Very Best of Yes (1993)
 Yes, Friends and Relatives (1998) 
 The Best of Yes (1999) 
 Yes, Friends and Relatives Vol. 2 (2000)
 In a Word: Yes (1969–)(2002)
 Yes, Friends and Relatives: The Ultimate Collection (2002)
 The Ultimate Yes: 35th Anniversary Collection (2003) - 3 CD Boxset
 Essentially Yes (2006) - 5 CD Boxset

With Anderson Bruford Wakeman Howe 
 Anderson Bruford Wakeman Howe (1989)
 An Evening of Yes Music Plus (1993) (live album)

With Asia 
Asia (1982)
Alpha (1983)
Aqua (1992)
Aura (2001)
Then & Now (1990 compilation, + four unreleased songs)
Fantasia: Live in Tokyo (2007) (also on DVD)
Phoenix (2008)
Omega (2010)
Asia (2010 remastered, like Super Audio CD)
 XXX (2012)

With GTR 
GTR (1986)
King Biscuit Flower Hour (1997)

With Paul Sutin 
 Seraphim (1989)
 Voyagers (1995)

With Explorers Club 
Age of Impact (1998)

With Oliver Wakeman 
 The 3 Ages of Magick (2001)

With Dylan Howe 
 Subterranean - New Designs on Bowie's Berlin (2014) - Steve plays koto on Moss Garden

With Virgil Howe 
 Nexus (Inside Out; November 2017) Steve plays guitars throughout the album
 Lunar Mist (Inside Out; September 2022)

Guest appearances
 Lou Reed - Lou Reed (session playing on most of the album) (1972) With Rick Wakeman.
 Curtiss Maldoon - Curtiss Maldoon (1972)
 Johnny Harris - All to bring you morning (1973) With Jon Anderson & Alan White.
 Rick Wakeman - "Catherine of Aragon", album The Six Wives of Henry VIII (1973)
 Alan White - "Song Of Innocence", album Ramshackled (1975) With Jon Anderson
 The Dregs - "Up in the Air", album Industry Standard (1982)
 Propaganda - "The Murder of Love", album A Secret Wish  (1985)
 Billy Currie - Transportation, appears on 6 of 8 tracks (1988)
 Guitar Speak - Various artists (1988) 
 Andy Leek - Say Something album (1988) 
 Animal Logic - Animal Logic album (1989) 
 Various artists - Night of the Guitar Live (1989), appears on 4 tracks 
 Rick Wakeman - Classical Connection II album (1992) With Chris Squire and Alaln White
 London Philharmonic Orchestra - Symphonic Music of Yes (1993) - With Jon Anderson and Bill Bruford
 The Bee Gees - Size Isn't Everything (1993)
 Fish - "Time and a Word", album Yin (1995)
 Frankie Goes to Hollywood - "Welcome to the Pleasuredome", album Welcome to the Pleasuredome (1984)
 Frankie Goes to Hollywood - "Maximum Joy", album Liverpool (1986)
 Queen - "Innuendo", album Innuendo (1991)
 Martin Taylor - Artistry (1992)
 Dream Theater - "Starship Trooper", DVD 5 Years in a Livetime (1998)
 Dylan Howe - Steve plays koto on "Moss Garden", album Subterranean: New Designs on Bowie's Berlin (2014)
 Various artists - "Light My Fire", album Light My Fire—A Classic Rock Salute to The Doors (2014)
 Matthew Sweet and Susanna Hoffs - Under the Covers, Vol. 2 (2009)
 William Shatner - Seeking Major Tom (2011) With Patrick Moraz
 Nektar - A Spoonful of Time (2012) With Geoff Downes, Rick Wakeman, Patrick Moraz
 Rick Wakeman - Starship Trooper album (2016, compilation), appears on The great gig in the sky and Light my fire
 Paul K Joyce - Celestial  (2019)

References 

Yes (band)
Discographies of British artists
Rock music discographies